KBMO (1290 AM) is a commercial radio station licensed to Benson, Minnesota, United States.  The station, established in 1956, is currently owned by Justin Klinghagen and John Jennings, through licensee Headwaters Media, LLC. Programming is also heard on FM translator K278CX at 103.5 MHz.

KBMO broadcasts a Soft Oldies - Adult Standards radio format.  It switches to Christmas music for much of December.

History
This station began regular broadcast operations in December 1956 under the ownership of Arline H. Steinbach. In 1960, it was acquired by North Star Broadcasting Company, Inc.

In October 1982, North Star Broadcasting Company, Inc., reached an agreement to sell KBMO to Joseph John Garamella, M.D.  The deal was approved by the FCC on December 16, 1982.

In December 1988, Joseph John Garamella, M.D., filed an application with the FCC to transfer the broadcast license for this station to a new company called Garamella Broadcasting Company.  The transfer was approved by the FCC on January 18, 1989, and the transaction was consummated on March 1, 1989.  The new company applied for a new call sign and the station was assigned KSCR by the Federal Communications Commission on February 26, 1990.

In September 1991, Garamella Broadcasting Company agreed to sell this station to Davies Broadcasting Company.  The deal was approved by the FCC on November 8, 1991, and the transaction was consummated on November 15, 1991.

In March 1994, Davies Broadcasting Company reached an agreement to sell this station to Quest Broadcasting, Inc.  The deal was approved by the FCC on April 12, 1994, and the transaction was consummated on May 2, 1994.

The station was re-assigned the heritage KBMO call sign by the FCC on February 10, 2000.

In October 2013, Quest Broadcasting reached an agreement to sell KBMO (and sister station KSCR-FM) to Headwaters Media, LLC for $275,000. The FCC approved the deal on January 10, 2014, and the transaction was formally consummated on February 28, 2014.

References

External links

Radio stations in Minnesota
Nostalgia radio in the United States
Radio stations established in 1956
Swift County, Minnesota
1956 establishments in Minnesota